Orchard Homes is a census-designated place (CDP) in Missoula County, Montana, United States. It is part of the Missoula Metropolitan Statistical Area. The population was 5,197 at the 2010 census, a decrease  from its population of 5,199 in 2000.

Geography
Orchard Homes is located at  (46.860044, -114.058028).

Demographics

At the 2000 census, there were 5,199 people, 2,034 households and 1,466 families residing in the CDP. The population density was 814.9 per square mile (314.6/km). There were 2,091 housing units at an average density of 327.8/sq mi (126.5/km). The racial makeup of the CDP was 95.35% White, 0.13% African American, 1.35% Native American, 1.29% Asian, 0.12% Pacific Islander, 0.52% from other races, and 1.25% from two or more races. Hispanic or Latino of any race were 1.35% of the population.

There were 2,034 households, of which 31.7% had children under the age of 18 living with them, 58.9% were married couples living together, 9.6% had a female householder with no husband present, and 27.9% were non-families. 21.0% of all households were made up of individuals, and 7.9% had someone living alone who was 65 years of age or older. The average household size was 2.55 and the average family size was 2.96.

24.2% of the population were under the age of 18, 9.7% from 18 to 24, 25.1% from 25 to 44, 28.4% from 45 to 64, and 12.6% who were 65 years of age or older. The median age was 40 years. For every 100 females, there were 95.3 males. For every 100 females age 18 and over, there were 94.2 males.

The median household income was $40,240 and the median family income was $47,612. Males had a median income of $32,226 and females $20,576 for. The per capita income was $17,885. About 4.4% of families and 6.7% of the population were below the poverty line, including 7.3% of those under age 18 and 4.3% of those age 65 or over.

References

Census-designated places in Missoula County, Montana
Census-designated places in Montana